The Voisin IV was a French two-seat bomber and ground attack aircraft of World War I.

Design
The Voisin IV was a biplane with a single engine in a pusher configuration, developed by Voisin in 1915 with staggered wings. It differed from earlier Voisin combat aircraft designs in having a mounted  or  cannon.

Variants
 Voisin LB : Two-seat bomber, ground-attack biplane.
 Voisin LBS : Improved version.

Operators

 Aéronautique Militaire

Specifications

References

Bibliography

Further reading

 

04
1910s French bomber aircraft
Single-engined pusher aircraft
Biplanes
Military aircraft of World War I
Aircraft first flown in 1915